Tom Keene (born George Duryea; December 30, 1896 – August 4, 1963) was an American actor known mostly for his roles in B Westerns.  During his almost 40-year career in motion pictures Tom Keene worked under three different names.  From 1923, when he made his first picture, until 1930 he worked under his birth name George Duryea.  The last film he made under this name was Pardon My Gun. Beginning with the 1930 film Tol'able David, he used Tom Keene as his moniker.  This name he used up to 1944 when he changed it to Richard Powers.  The first film he used this name in was Up in Arms. He continued to use this name for the rest of his film career.

Early life and career
Born George Duryea (no known relation to fellow actor Dan Duryea despite a resemblance) in Rochester, New York, Keene studied at Columbia University and Carnegie Tech before embarking on an acting career. He made his film debut in the 1923 short film The Just a Little Late Club. Keene followed with roles in The Godless Girl (1929) directed by Cecil B. DeMille; Tide of Empire (1929) with Renée Adorée; Thunder with Lon Chaney, Sr.; Tol'able David (1930) and Sundown Trail (1931). In 1934 King Vidor cast him in the socially conscious Depression oriented classic Our Daily Bread with Karen Morley.

During the 1940s, Keene appeared in the film serial The Great Alaskan Mystery and two Dick Tracy films Dick Tracy's Dilemma and Dick Tracy Meets Gruesome (1947). In the 1950s, he moved on to television with guest roles on The Range Rider; Buffalo Bill, Jr.; Fury; Judge Roy Bean and The Adventures of Ozzie and Harriet. Keene's last film role was in Ed Wood's cult film Plan 9 from Outer Space (1957).  He retired soon after this and focused on real estate and the insurance business.

Death

Keene died of cancer on August 4, 1963, aged 66. He was interred in the Forest Lawn Memorial Park Cemetery in Glendale, California.

Filmography

Later in his career (after 1944), Keene was often credited as Richard Powers, and once as Dick Powers.

References

External links

 
 

20th-century American male actors
American male film actors
American male silent film actors
American male television actors
Deaths from cancer in California
Columbia University alumni
Burials at Forest Lawn Memorial Park (Glendale)
Male Western (genre) film actors
Male actors from Rochester, New York
1896 births
1963 deaths
Carnegie Mellon University alumni